The former Austria-Hungary empire had a narrow-gauge rail network thousands of kilometres in length, most of it using Bosnian gauge  or  gauge, constructed between 1870 and 1920. Landlords, mines, agricultural and forest estates established their own branch lines which, as they united into regional networks, increasingly played a role in regional passenger traffic. Following the Treaty of Trianon some railways were cut by the new border, many remained on the territory of Romania, Czechoslovakia and Yugoslavia. Due to a lack of intact roads, following World War II in many places narrow-gauge railway was the only reasonable way to get around. In 1968 the Communist government started to implement a policy to dismantle the narrow-gauge network in favour of road traffic. Freight haulage on the few remaining lines continued to decline until 1990 from when a patchwork of railways was gradually taken over by associations and forest managements for tourist purposes. State Railways operated narrow-gauge railways at Nyíregyháza and Kecskemét that played a role in regional transport until December 2009.

Common carrier railways
 Kecskemét narrow-gauge network (no operation since 2009)
 Nyíregyháza narrow-gauge network (no operation since 2009)
 Balatonfenyves Narrow Gauge Railway

Forest railways

 Almamellék Forest Railway,  narrow gauge
 Csömödér Forest Railway
 Gemenc State Forest Railway
 Debrecen Forest Railway
 Felsőtárkány Forest Railway, Southern Bükk Mountains, near Eger, now a tourist railway, (see below).
 Kemence Forest Museum Railway,  narrow gauge
 Királyrét Forest Railway – Kismaros
 Lillafüred Forest Train, now a tourist railway, 2 lines Miskolc – Lillafüred – Újmassa and Miskolc – Mahóca.
 Mesztegnyő Forest Railway
 Nagybörzsöny Forest Railway – Nagyírtás - Márianosztra - Szob
 Pálháza Forest Railway
 Mátra railway, 2 lines, Gyöngyös–Mátrafüred / Lajosháza

Children's railways
 Budapest Children's railway, the  Gyermekvasút.
 Mecsek Children's railway, Pécs
 Tiszakécske Children's railway (Suspended in 2009, Reopened in 2021)
 Széchenyi Museum Railway (operated by children)

Heritage railways
 Szalajka-Eisenbahn Szilvasvarad – Szalajka-völgy, tourist railway in a national park, 5 km, part of former extensive Felsőtárkány Forest Railway
 Széchenyi Museum Railway
 Vál Valley Light Railway

References